BBC Entertainment is an international television channel broadcasting comedy, drama, light entertainment, reality and children's programming (some regions only) from the BBC, Channel 4 and other UK production houses. The channel broadcasts regional versions to suit local demands and replaced BBC Prime. It is wholly owned by BBC Studios.

Launch dates
The channel was launched in October 2006, replacing BBC Prime in Asian markets such as Singapore, Hong Kong, Thailand and South Korea. On 28 December 2006, it was launched on the Astro platform in Malaysia.  The channel was launched in India in May 2007 on the Tata Sky platform and on India online Broadband Public Limited, but ceased broadcasting at the end of November 2012 due to "commercial considerations".

The channel was launched in Poland, on Cyfrowy Polsat, in December 2007, and replaced BBC Prime on DStv in South Africa on 1 September 2008. It was launched together with its sister channels (BBC Knowledge, BBC Lifestyle and BBC HD) in the Nordic countries in November 2008, when it replaced BBC Prime on Canal Digital, Com Hem, Telia Digital-TV and FastTV. The Nordic countries get a separate feed of the channel which differs from that in the rest of Europe. It was also launched in Mexico on the SKY México digital satellite platform in August 2008 in a deal with Televisa, and it has since extended to other Central and South American countries.

The channel replaced BBC Prime in the rest of Europe and the Middle East & North Africa in November 2009. In Belgium, the Netherlands and Switzerland, BBC Entertainment is carried alongside BBC One and BBC Two on the Telenet, Ziggo, and Naxoo cable networks.

On 1 December 2009, Astro dropped the channel and replaced it with ITV Choice. On 1 March 2010 in Italy Sky Italia also dropped the channel. In 2010 Kabel Deutschland (Germany) made it a pay-TV channel.

In August 2012, Unifi picked up the channel, thus making the channel available in Malaysia once more after a 3-year hiatus. However Unifi dropped the channel in December 2015.

On 13 April 2017, BBC Entertainment ceased its transmissions in Latin American countries, along with BBC Earth and CBeebies.

Finally, BBC First was launched in some Asian regions on 19 March 2016. Singapore Via Starhub TV broadcasts ceased on 29 April 2015, while in Hong Kong, Thailand and Indonesia, broadcasts ceased on 1 January 2017. In Myanmar and Mongolia, broadcasts ceased on 1 March 2018. In Taiwan, broadcasts ceased on 10 March 2017 and were replaced by CBeebies.

Programming

This table is not complete

See also
 BBC America
 BBC Canada
 BBC Earth
 BBC First
 BBC HD (international)
 BBC Knowledge
 BBC Lifestyle
 BBC World News
 CBBC
 CBeebies

References

External links
 BBC Entertainment - Official website
 BBC Nordic - Official website
 BBC to launch global TV channels BBC News Online
 BBC Worldwide bows new channels Variety
 BBC launches entertainment, kids channels
 BBC Worldwide, Televisa to launch channels
 BBC Prime to be rebranded as BBC Entertainment in Europe and Middle East

International BBC television channels
Television channels and stations established in 2006
Television channels in the Netherlands
Television channels in Belgium
Television channels in Flanders
English-language television stations in India
Television stations in Singapore
Television stations in Hong Kong
BBC Worldwide
Defunct television channels in India